The ghaṭam (  ghaṭaṁ,  
ghaṭah, 
ghatam,  ghatam, ghatam) is a percussion instrument used in various repertoires across India especially in Tamil Nadu. It's a variant played in Punjab and known as gharha as it is a part of Punjabi folk traditions. Its analogue in Rajasthan is known as the madga and pani mataqa ("water jug").

The ghatam is one of the most ancient percussion instruments of India. It is a clay pot with narrow mouth. From the mouth, it slants outwards to form a ridge. Made mainly of clay baked with brass or copper filings with a small amount of iron filings, the pitch of the ghatam varies according to its size. The pitch can be slightly altered by the application of plasticine clay or water.

Although the ghatam is the same shape as an ordinary Indian domestic clay pot, it is made specifically to be played as an instrument. The tone of the pot must be good and the walls should be of even thickness to produce an even tone and nice sound.

Ghatams are mostly manufactured in Manamadurai, a place near Madurai in Tamil Nadu. Though this instrument is manufactured in other places like Chennai and Bangalore, too, Manamadurai ghatams have special tonal quality. It is believed that the mud is of special quality. The Manamadurai ghaṭam is a heavy, thick pot with tiny shards of brass mixed into the clay. This type of ghaṭam is harder to play but produces a sharp metallic ringing sound which is favored by some players.

Playing

The pot is usually placed on the lap of the performer, with the mouth facing the belly. The performer uses the fingers, thumbs, palms, and heels of the hands to strike its outer surface to produce different sounds. Different tones can be produced by hitting areas of the pot with different parts of the hands. Sometimes the ghatam is turned around so that the mouth faces the audience and the performer plays on the neck of the instrument. The ghatam can be moved to other positions while being played. Occasionally, the performer will, to the amusement of the audience, toss the instrument up in the air and catch it. The ghatam is ideal for playing rhythmic patterns in very fast tempo.

Etymology
The name ghaṭam is etymologically derived from the Sanskrit term ghaṭaka (pot) and the related term, kuṇḍa (pitcher). The cognate term for pot in Tamil is kuḍam (water pot). It is noteworthy that the term ghaṭam specifically carries the meaning of a percussive musical instrument. The other terms represent daily utensils without specific musical connotations.

Similar instruments
The madga is a north Indian version of the south Indian ghaṭam and is made from a very special clay. The maker sometimes adds some kind of metal or graphite dust to the clay which is responsible for the blue-gray appearance and for the special sound.

The madga can be played similarly to the ghaṭam. Loud bass tones can be produced if one hits with the flat hand the opening at the top of the instrument. The madga can be played with mallets (sticks) and there are many sounds which can be produced with this instrument. It is thinner than a ghaṭam but very stable and not as fragile as one might think.

In Gujarat and Rajasthan,

See also

References

Carnatic music instruments
Indian musical instruments
Asian percussion instruments
Pitched percussion instruments
Plosive aerophones